Dansili (27 January 1996 – 22 December 2021) was a British Thoroughbred racehorse. He won five races, including the Prix du Muguet. After retiring from racing he became a successful stallion, with his progeny including Prix de l'Arc de Triomphe winner Rail Link and King George VI and Queen Elizabeth Stakes winner Harbinger. He also became Champion sire in France in 2006.

Background
Dansili, a bay colt, was foaled on 27 January 1996. Bred by Juddmonte Farms, he is a son of Haydock Sprint Cup winner Danehill. Danehill was a British Champion sire three times and sired many top horses, with his progeny including Banks Hill, Champs Elysees, Desert King, Duke of Marmalade, Dylan Thomas, George Washington, Mozart, Rock of Gibraltar, and Westerner.

Dansili's dam, Hasili, won four races as a two-year-old and is a daughter of Epsom Derby winner Kahyasi. She has also foaled Prix Jacques Le Marois winner Banks Hill, Breeders' Cup Filly & Mare Turf winner Intercontinental, Man o' War Stakes winner Cacique, Matriarch Stakes winner Heat Haze and Canadian International Stakes winner Champs Elysees. Banks Hill, Intercontinental, Cacique, and Champs Elysees were also sired by Danehill.

Racing career
Dansili's only run as a two-year-old was in the Prix de Blaison at Longchamp, where he won by half a length over Bedawin. He returned as a three-year-old in May and won the Prix du Labyrinthe. He then started as the 17/5 joint-favourite for the Poule d'Essai des Poulains. He finished in second place, 1½ lengths behind Sendawar. Dansili then finished fourth in the Prix Jean Prat. He then dropped in class for the Group 3 Prix Messidor and won it by four lengths over Kabool. In his last two races of the season he finished in third behind Dubai Millennium in the Prix du Haras de Fresnay-le-Buffard Jacques Le Marois and third behind Sendawar in the Prix du Moulin de Longchamp.

Dansili started his four-year-old career by winning the Prix Edmond Blanc and Prix du Muguet. He then went to Royal Ascot for the Queen Anne Stakes. Racing outside France for the first time, he started at the odds of 100/30. Ridden by Olivier Peslier, he took the lead with one furlong left to run, but was overtaken by Kalanisi in the final 100 yards. Kalanisi went on to win by half a length over Dansili, who just held off Swallow Flight to secure second place. He then finished second again in the Sussex Stakes. This time he was beaten by Giant's Causeway by ¾ length. Racing again in France, he then disappointed in the Prix du Moulin de Longchamp after starting as favourite. In his final two races he finished second behind Indian Lodge in the Prix de la Forêt and third behind War Chant in the Breeders' Cup Mile. During his racing career Dansili earned £373,602.

Stud career
After the 2000 season, Dansili was retired to stud, where he became a successful stallion at Banstead Manor Stud for Juddmonte Farms. His son Harbinger was officially the highest rated horse in the world in 2010. Dansili is the sire of 21 individual Group 1 winners including Harbinger, The Fugue, Flintshire, Zoffany, Passage Of Time, Fallen For You, Emulous, and Winsili. His Group 2 winning sprinter son, Bated Breath, stands as a stallion at Banstead Manor Stud. Dansili is also the broodmare sire of many successful performers, including Group 1 winners Astaire, Chicquita, and Expert Eye.

Dansili was retired from stud duty in April 2018 due to declining fertility. He died after a short illness on 22 December 2021, at the age of 25.

Notable progeny

c = colt, f = filly

Pedigree

Note: b. = Bay, ch. = Chestnut

* Dansili is inbred 4x4 to Natalma. This means that the mare appears twice in the fourth generation of his pedigree.

References

1996 racehorse births
2021 racehorse deaths
Racehorses bred in the United Kingdom
Racehorses trained in France
Thoroughbred family 11